Parasa is a genus of moths of the family Limacodidae. It was described by Frederic Moore in 1860.

Description
Palpi projecting beyond frontal tuft. Forewings are rounded at apex. Veins 7, 8, and 9 stalked. Veinlet in cell forked or the lower discocellular absent. The fork of the veinlet replacing it. Hindwing with veins 6 and 7 on a short stalk or from cell. Hind tibia with a terminal pair of spurs.

Species
albipuncta species group
Parasa albipuncta Hampson, 1893
Parasa hampsoni Dyar, 1894
Parasa zhudiana (Cai, 1983)
argentifascia species group
Parasa argentifascia (R.Q. Cai, 1983)
Parasa eupuncta (R.Q. Cai, 1983)
Parasa liangdiana (R.Q. Cai, 1983)
Parasa mutifascia (R.Q. Cai, 1983)
Parasa parapuncta (R.Q. Cai, 1983)
argentilinea species group
Parasa argentilinea Hampson, 1893
bicolor species group
Parasa albida Candèze, 1927
Parasa argyroneura Hering, 1931
Parasa bicolor (Walker, 1855)
Parasa feina (Cai, 1983)
Parasa flavabdomena (Cai, 1983)
Parasa foliola Solovyev & Witt, 2009
Parasa hainana (Cai, 1983)
Parasa jade Solovyev & Witt, 2009
Parasa jiana (Cai, 1983)
Parasa mina (R.Q. Cai, 1983)
Parasa pseudobicolor Holloway, 1990
Parasa umbra Solovyev & Witt, 2009
Parasa virescens (Matsumura, 1911)
Parasa yana (Cai, 1983)
bimaculata species group
Parasa anchutka Solovyev, 2011
Parasa balitkae Holloway, 1987
Parasa bimaculata (Snellen, 1897)
Parasa brillians Holloway, 1987
Parasa chlorostigma (Snellen, 1879)
Parasa fidea Solovyev, 2011
Parasa semperi Holloway, 1987
consocia species group
Parasa consocia Walker, 1865
Parasa humeralis Walker, 1862
Parasa lorquini (Reakirt, 1864)
Parasa neopastoralis Rose, 2004
Parasa pastoralis Butler, 1885
Parasa stekolnikovi Solovyev & Witt, 2009
Parasa zulona Reakirt, 1864
darma species group
Parasa darma Moore, 1859
Parasa darmoides Holloway, 1982
herbifera species group
Parasa bana (Cai, 1983)
Parasa barbatanellus Holloway, 1990
Parasa canangae Hering, 1931
Parasa canangoides Holloway, 1986
Parasa herbifera (Walker, 1855)
Parasa melli Hering, 1931
Parasa mustacha Holloway, 1990
jina species group
Parasa atera Solovyev & Witt, 2009
Parasa jina (R.Q. Cai, 1983)
lepida species group
Parasa actiacus Solovyev, 2011
Parasa corbetti Holloway, 1987
Parasa emeralda Solovyev & Witt, 2009
Parasa himalepida Holloway, 1987
Parasa julikatis Solovyev & Witt, 2009
Parasa lepida (Cramer, 1779)
Parasa media (Walker, 1855)
Parasa philepida Holloway, 1987
Parasa shirakii Kawada, 1930
Parasa sundalepida Holloway, 1986
ostia species group
Parasa altilis Solovyev & Witt, 2009
Parasa ostia Swinhoe, 1902
Parasa prasina Alphéraky, 1895
Parasa shaanxiensis (Cai, 1983)
Parasa vadimi Solovyev & Witt, 2009
repanda species group
Parasa campagnei de Joannis, 1928
Parasa repanda (Walker, 1855)
Parasa pseudorepanda Hering, 1933
undulata species group
Parasa minwangi Wu & Chang, 2013
Parasa viridiflamma Wu & Chang, 2013
Parasa martini Solovyev, 2011
Parasa pygmy Solovyev, 2011
Parasa undulata (R.Q. Cai, 1983)
xueshana species group
Parasa badia Solovyev & Witt, 2009
Parasa dilucida Solovyev & Witt, 2009
Parasa xueshana (R.Q. Cai, 1983)
unknown species group
Parasa campylostagma Dognin, 1914
Parasa chloris (Herrich-Schäffer, [1854])
Parasa dusii Solovyev & Saldaitis, 2010
Parasa euchlora Karsch, 1896
Parasa figueresi Corrales & Epstein, 2004
Parasa hilarula (Staudinger, 1887)
Parasa imitata Druce, 1887
Parasa indetermina (Boisduval, 1832)
Parasa joanae Epstein, 2004
Parasa laonome Druce, 1887
Parasa laranda Druce, 1887
Parasa prussi Karsch, 1896
Parasa sandrae Corrales & Epstein, 2004
Parasa shirleyae Corrales & Epstein, 2004
Parasa sinica Moore, 1877
Parasa solovyevi C.S. Wu, 2011

References 

 , 1983. A study on the Chinese Latoia Guérin-Meneville with description of new species (Lepidoptera: Limacodidae). Acta Entomologica Sinica 26 (4): 438–451.
 ;  2004: Twenty-five new species of Costa Rican Limacodidae (Lepidoptera: Zygaenoidea). Zootaxa, 701: 1-86. Abstract & excerpt PDF
 , 2010: Parasa haxairei n. sp. (Lepidoptera, Limacodidae). Bulletin de la Société entomologique de Mulhouse 66 (4): 67-69.
 , 2008: The limacodid moths (Lepidoptera: Limacodidae) of Russia. Eversmannia 15/16: 17-43.
 , 2011: New species of the genus Parasa (Lepidoptera, Limacodidae) from Southeastern Asia. Entomological Review 91 (1): 96-102. 
 ;  2010: A new species of the genus Parasa Moore (Lepidoptera: Limacodidae) from Yemen. Journal of insect science, 10(190)  [validly published?]
 , 2009: The Limacodidae of Vietnam. Entomofauna Supplement 16: 33-229.
 , 2011: Six new species and twelve newly recorded species of Limacodidae from China (Lepidoptera: Zygaenoidea). Acta Zootaxonomica Sinica 36 (2): 249-256.

Limacodidae genera
Limacodidae
Taxa named by Frederic Moore